The 2017 season of competitive association football in Malaysia.

Promotion and relegation

Pre-season

New and withdrawn teams

New teams 
  DBKL (FAM League)
  Kuching (FAM League)
  Terengganu City F.C. (FAM League)

Withdrawn teams 
  DRB-HICOM (Premier League)
  DYS (FAM League)
  Megah Murni (FAM League)
  Ipoh (FAM League)
  Sungai Ara (FAM League)

National team

Malaysia national football team

2019 AFC Asian Cup qualification – Third Round

International Friendlies

Malaysia national under-22 football team

2018 AFC U-23 Championship qualification

2017 Southeast Asian Games

Dubai Cup

International Friendlies

Malaysia national under-19 football team

2018 AFC U-19 Championship qualification

2017 AFF U-18 Youth Championship

Malaysia national under-16 football team

2018 AFC U-16 Championship qualification

2017 AFF U-15 Championship

League season

Super League

Premier League

FAM League

Group A

Group B

Final

First leg

Second leg

Sime Darby won 3–2 on aggregate.

Domestic Cups

Charity Shield

FA Cup

Final

Malaysia Cup

Final

Malaysian clubs in Asia

Johor Darul Ta'zim

AFC Champions League

Qualifying play-off

AFC Cup

Group stage

Zonal Semi-finals

FELDA United

AFC Cup

Group stage

Footnotes

References